Dakota County is a county in the U.S. state of Nebraska. As of the 2020 United States Census, the population was 21,582. Its county seat is Dakota City.

Dakota County is part of the Sioux City, IA–NE–SD Metropolitan Statistical Area.

In the Nebraska license plate system, Dakota County is represented by the prefix 70 (it had the 70th-largest number of vehicles registered in the county when the license plate system was established in 1922). In August 2009, the Dakota County Board of Commissioners reversed a decision to abandon this system for alphanumeric plates upon introduction of new license plates in 2011. Douglas, Lancaster, and Sarpy Counties remain the only counties with alphanumeric plates in the state.

History
Succeeding cultures of indigenous peoples lived along the Missouri River for millennia. By 1775, the Omaha people had migrated west of the Missouri, where they established a major settlement, Ton-wa-tonga, (the Big Village). It had some 1100 residents. From here, the Omaha controlled fur trading on the upper Missouri River with other tribes and with French-Canadian traders, often called voyageurs. The Omaha were the first of the Northern Plains tribes to have adopted an equestrian culture.

Dakota County was formed by European-American settlers in 1855. They named it after the Dakota Sioux tribe, who were powerful in the area of Nebraska and South Dakota at the time. By this time, the Omaha were concentrated further south in what became the state of Nebraska.

In 1885, the county went to the United States Supreme Court in Dakota County v. Glidden over a dispute with issuing bonds.

As of May 2020, the county had the second-highest per capita COVID-19 infection rate of any American county. About one of every 14 residents has tested positive, mostly at Tyson's large  meat packing plant in Dakota City. There were 1452 cases reported as of May 11, 2020. This had increased by 4 July 2020, to 1634 cases, and 38 deaths, giving Dakota County the highest per capita death rate to that date.

Geography
Dakota County lies on the northeast line of the Nebraska state line. Its northeast boundary line abuts the southwest boundary lines of the states of South Dakota and Iowa, across the Missouri River.  The county terrain consists of rolling prairies and bottom lands.

It is the second-smallest county in Nebraska by area.

Major highways

  Interstate 129
  U.S. Highway 20
  U.S. Highway 75
  U.S. Highway 77
  Nebraska Highway 9
  Nebraska Highway 12
  Nebraska Highway 35
  Nebraska Highway 110

Adjacent counties

 Union County, South Dakota - northeast
 Woodbury County, Iowa - east
 Thurston County - south
 Dixon County - west

Demographics

As of the 2020 United States Census The racial makeup of the county was 43.3% non-hispanic white, 7.4% African American, 2.8% Asian and 40.8% hispanic.

As of the 2010 United States Census, there were 21,006 people and 7,314 households residing in the county. The racial makeup of the county was 85% White, 4.8% Black or African American, 4.1% Native American, 3.3% Asian, 0.6% Pacific Islander, and 2.2% from two or more races. 39.7% of the population were Hispanic or Latino of any race. Non-Hispanic Whites were 48.4% of the population.

As of the 2000 United States Census, there were 20,253 people, 7,095 households, and 5,087 families residing in the county. The racial makeup of the county was 78.84% White, 0.62% Black or African American, 1.86% Native American, 3.08% Asian, 0.06% Pacific Islander, 12.91% from other races, and 2.62% from two or more races. 22.62% of the population were Hispanic or Latino of any race. 28.0% were of German and 10.5% Irish ancestry.

There were 7,095 households, out of which 39.90% had children under the age of 18 living with them, 54.60% were married couples living together, 11.90% had a female householder with no husband present, and 28.30% were non-families. 22.90% of all households were made up of individuals, and 9.00% had someone living alone who was 65 years of age or older. The average household size was 2.81 and the average family size was 3.30.

The county population contained 30.50% under the age of 18, 10.10% from 18 to 24, 29.40% from 25 to 44, 20.10% from 45 to 64, and 9.90% who were 65 years of age or older. The median age was 31 years. For every 100 females, there were 99.70 males. For every 100 females age 18 and over, there were 97.10 males.

The median income for a household in the county was $38,834, and the median income for a family was $43,702. Males had a median income of $28,341 versus $22,035 for females. The per capita income for the county was $16,125. About 9.20% of families and 11.40% of the population were below the poverty line, including 14.60% of those under age 18 and 8.60% of those age 65 or over.

Communities

Cities
 Dakota City (county seat)
 South Sioux City

Villages
 Emerson (partial)
 Homer
 Hubbard
 Jackson

Unincorporated communities
 Goodwin
 Nacora
 Willis

Politics
Dakota County voters have leaned Republican for several decades. From 1952, the county has selected the Republican Party candidate in over 80% of national elections, but the significant Hispanic population has led to the margins of victory not being as wide as those in most rural counties in the state.

See also
 National Register of Historic Places listings in Dakota County, Nebraska

References

 
Sioux City metropolitan area
Nebraska counties on the Missouri River
1855 establishments in Nebraska Territory